Parkview is a hamlet in the Canadian province of Saskatchewan.

Demographics 

References

Designated places in Saskatchewan
Marquis No. 191, Saskatchewan
Organized hamlets in Saskatchewan